Momisis longzhouensis is a species of beetle in the family Cerambycidae. It was described by Hua in 1982. It is known from China.

References

Astathini
Beetles described in 1982